The East Kirkton Limestone is a rock unit in the West Lothian Oil-Shale Formation in Scotland. It preserves fossils of the Carboniferous period. The limestone outcrops at East Kirkton Quarry.

See also

 Kirktonecta
 List of fossiliferous stratigraphic units in Scotland
 Westlothiana

References
 

Carboniferous System of Europe
Carboniferous Scotland
Limestone formations
Carboniferous southern paleotropical deposits
Viséan